William Mortlock (18 July 1832 at Kennington, London – 23 January 1884 at Lambeth, London) was an English professional cricketer who played first-class cricket from 1851 to 1870.  His brother Thomas was a first-class umpire.

A right-handed batsman and slow underarm bowler who played for Surrey County Cricket Club, Mortlock made 191 known appearances in first-class matches.  He represented the Players in the Gentlemen v Players series.  

Mortlock sometimes opened the innings and he scored a total of 5528 runs at an average of 18.73 with a highest score of 106.  He made three career centuries.  A versatile fielder, renowned as a longstop who seldom allowed a bye, he took 85 catches.  He took 147 wickets with underarm bowling at 18.02 with a best analysis of 7/42 and he twice claimed ten wickets in a match. Haygarth considered his lob bowling 'rubbish'. Mortlock participated in the first cricket tour of Australia in 1861-2. The team travelled to Australia on the SS Great Britain.  It was on this tour that Mortlock gained the nickname 'Old Stonewall' for his stubborn defensive batting and longstopping.

Mortlock died at his home in Acre Lane, Brixton, on 23 January 1884, after an illness that had incapacitated him for two years. He was buried at West Norwood Cemetery.

References

External links

Further reading
 H S Altham, A History of Cricket, Volume 1 (to 1914), George Allen & Unwin, 1962
 Arthur Haygarth, Scores & Biographies, Volumes 1-11 (1744–1870), Lillywhite, 1862–72

1832 births
1884 deaths
English cricketers
English cricketers of 1826 to 1863
English cricketers of 1864 to 1889
Players cricketers
Surrey cricketers
Burials at West Norwood Cemetery
North v South cricketers
Surrey Club cricketers
Married v Single cricketers
North of the Thames v South of the Thames cricketers
Players of the South cricketers
Players of Surrey cricketers